"Summer Wine" is a song written by Lee Hazlewood. It was originally sung by Suzi Jane Hokom and Lee Hazlewood in 1966, but it was made famous by Nancy Sinatra and Lee Hazlewood in 1967.

Lyrics
Lyrically, "Summer Wine" describes a man, voiced by Hazlewood, who meets a woman, Hokom/Sinatra, who notices his silver spurs and invites him to have wine with her. After heavy drinking, the man awakens hungover to find his spurs and money have been stolen by the mysterious woman. He then declares a longing for more of her "wine".

Nancy Sinatra & Lee Hazlewood version

The Nancy & Lee version was originally released on Sinatra's Nancy in London album in late 1966 and later as the B-side of her "Sugar Town" single in December 1966. The song itself became a hit, reaching No. 49 on Billboard's Hot 100 chart in April 1967. It also reached No. 14 in Australia. In early 1968, "Summer Wine" was included on Sinatra and Hazlewood's album of duets, Nancy & Lee LP. It was the first of Sinatra and Hazlewood's string of hit duets.

In May 2017, retail clothier, H&M, used Nancy & Lee's version in their "The Summer Shop 2017" ad campaign and as a result, the track debuted at No. 1 on Billboard magazine and Clio's Top TV Commercials chart for May 2017.

Charts

Covers

In 1968 the song was covered by Kela Gates in Spanish with the Peruvian band Los Belkings with the title Néctar de verano.

In 1967 the French Canadian Robert Demontigny with Claude Valade has covered this song in French titled Vin d'été. 

A French cover called "Le Vin de l'été" was also released by Marie Laforêt and Gérard Klein in 1969 (French lyrics by Eddy Marnay).

A Hebrew cover called also "Yen Kayitz" (=Summer Wine) was released by Chava Alberstein and Dani Litani in 1976 to the translation of Ehud Manor.

The song was later covered by: Demis Roussos with Nancy Boyd,
The Corrs featuring Bono (on the 2002 live album VH1 Presents: The Corrs, Live in Dublin),
Ultima Thule, Gry with FM Einheit and his orchestra,
Anna Hanski & Lee Hazlewood,
Evan Dando & Sabrina Brooke,
Scooter (on the 2000 album Sheffield),
Jack Grace and Moimir Papalescu
and The Nihilists (with the male and female parts switched).

A cover version by Ville Valo & Natalia Avelon, recorded for the soundtrack of Das Wilde Leben, was the 4th best-selling single of 2007 in Germany and was certified Platinum by the BVMI.
 
"Summer Wine" was also covered by Ed Kuepper and Clare Bowditch on the cult Australian music game show RocKwiz.

A Flemish cover called Toverdrank (Magic Potion) (on the album Een man zoals ik (English: A man like me) was performed by Guido Belcanto and An Pierlé in 2011.

Two different German cover versions were released by Roland Kaiser (with Nancy Sinatra) in 1996 and by Claudia Jung & Nik P. in 2011.

An Icelandic cover called Sumarást (Summer love) was released by Hljómsveit Ingimars Eydal in 1968 and by Helgi Björnsson and Ragnhildur Steinunn Jónsdóttir in 2007 for the movie Astrópía.

On April 18, 2013, Lana Del Rey released a music video for her and Barrie-James O'Neill's (from Kassidy) cover of "Summer Wine" by Lee Hazlewood.

The Canadian singer Cœur de pirate recorded a cover for "Summer Wine", which was used on the "Trauma" TV series soundtrack.

On September 11, 2019, French singer Clara Luciani and Alex Kapranos (Franz Ferdinand) performed an English/French cover version of Summer Wine at Olympia in Paris. The cover was officially released in July 2020.

References

1960s ballads
1967 songs
Nancy Sinatra songs
Lee Hazlewood songs
Number-one singles in Finland
Number-one singles in Greece
Reprise Records singles
Songs written by Lee Hazlewood
Male–female vocal duets
Songs about alcohol